The Nature of Human Intelligence is a 1967 book by the American psychologist J. P. Guilford on human intelligence. It is an elaboration of Guilford's Structure of Intellect theory, where intelligence is a three-dimensional taxonomy of 120 elements.

References

1967 non-fiction books
Books about human intelligence